Worcester is an English surname. Notable people with the surname include:

 Alec Worcester (1887-1952), British stage and silent film actor
 Alfred Worcester (1855-1951), American medical doctor, pioneer in patient care, appendicitis, Caesarean section
 Bevan Worcester (1925-1969), Australian sailor
 Dean Conant Worcester (1866–1924), American zoologist, public official, and businessman
 Donald E. Worcester (1915-2003), historian of the American Southwest
 Henry Aiken Worcester (1802-1841), American Swedenborgian minister and vegetarian
 Jane Worcester (died 1989), American biostatistician and epidemiologist
 Joseph Emerson Worcester (1784–1865), American lexicographer
 Kent Worcester (born 1959), political scientist, historian, critic, and songwriter
 Maud Worcester Makemson (1891-1977), astronomer
 Noah Worcester (1758–1837), American peace activist
 Robert Worcester (born 1933), founder of Market and Opinion Research International Ltd.
 Samuel Worcester (1798–1859), American missionary to the Cherokees
 Samuel Worcester (theologian) (1770–1821), Unitarian controversialist
 Samuel T. Worcester (1804–1882), American politician
 Samuel Worcester Rowse (1822-1901), illustrator
 Thomas Worcester Hyde (1841-1899), Union brigadier general
 Thomas Worcester, American Jesuit academic
 Tracy Worcester (born 1958), English actress and environmental activist
 Wayne Worcester (born 1947), American journalist, author, and professor
 William Worcester (c. 1415 – c. 1482), English chronicler and antiquary

English toponymic surnames